Cassuto is a surname. Notable people with the surname include:

 Judah Cassuto (1808–1893), Dutch-German hazzan (cantor) of the Portuguese-Jewish community
 Sherry Cassuto (1957-2016), American rower
 Solica Cassuto, Greek actress, and second wife of actor Andy Griffith
 Umberto Cassuto (1883–1951), Italian rabbi and Biblical scholar

See also
 Cassutto